Albert Cohn may refer to:

Albert Cohn (scholar) (1814–1877), French Jewish philanthropist and scholar
Albert C. Cohn (1885–1959), father of Roy Cohn

See also
Albert Cohen (disambiguation)